The Report (styled as The Torture Report) is a 2019 American historical / political drama film written and directed by Scott Z. Burns that stars Adam Driver, Annette Bening, Ted Levine, Michael C. Hall, Tim Blake Nelson, Corey Stoll, Maura Tierney, and Jon Hamm. The plot follows staffer Daniel Jones and the Senate Intelligence Committee as they investigate the Central Intelligence Agency's use of torture following the September 11th attacks. It covers more than a decade's worth of real-life political intrigue, exploring and compacting Jones's 6,700-page report. It is partly based on the article "Rorschach and Awe" by American journalist Katherine Eban; that publication was originally distributed by the magazine Vanity Fair in July 2007.

The Report had its world premiere at the Sundance Film Festival on January 26, 2019, and was theatrically released in the United States on November 15, 2019, by Amazon Studios, before streaming on Amazon Prime beginning November 29, 2019.

The movie has received generally positive critical reviews. For example, Variety published a piece by Owen Gleiberman labeling it "at once gripping and eye-opening" in a manner that forces viewers to feel "chastened", the writer comparing the film to All the President's Men.

Plot

Daniel J. Jones, a Senate staffer, is selected by Senator Dianne Feinstein to lead an investigation into the 2005 destruction of CIA interrogation videotapes. Jones' small team of six begins work in early 2009 reviewing 6 million pages of CIA materials in a SCIF.

The narrative shifts back to the September 11 attacks of 2001, introducing George Tenet, Bernadette, and Gretchen at the Counterterrorist Center (CTC), anxiously watching live videos of the attacks. At CIA headquarters a few days later, Tenet reports on his meeting at Camp David with President George W. Bush and CTC director Cofer Black. John Rizzo, the CIA's legal counsel, reports that the President had given the CIA powers to "capture and detain suspected terrorists." The next year, intelligence psychologists Bruce Jessen and James Elmer Mitchell are contracted to instruct the CIA in enhanced interrogation techniques (EITs).

Jones meets with FBI agent Ali Soufan and learns more about the CIA's interrogation program, particularly regarding Abu Zubaydah. The interrogation of Abu Zubaydah is shown, contrasting the FBI's approach with the CIA's enhanced interrogation techniques. Bernadette is present as a witness. Soufan says they kept Zubaydah alive and gathered crucial intelligence in the days before the CIA took over the interrogations. The CIA disagreed on techniques and results.

Jones briefs Senator Feinstein in her office, providing the evidence from the CIA's own records proving that the CIA knew Zubaydah was not a high-ranking member of al-Qaeda, as they had falsely reported to the Department of Justice (DOJ). After the CIA told President Bush that Zubaydah was a key player, they received authorization in an August 2002 CIA memo to torture Zubaydah, making him the first detainee to be tortured.

Raymond Nathan, a physician assistant with the Office of Medical Services, secretly meets with Jones and tells him that he and others had wanted to leave the service because of the use of torture. He witnessed the waterboarding of Zubaydah, who almost drowned and who lost consciousness during the procedure. Nathan tells Jones that they were told by Director Jose Rodriguez to not put their complaints in writing.

Jones and April uncover the story of Gul Rahman, who died from hypothermia in 2002 after CIA interrogators left him chained to the ground overnight in a 36 °F (2 °C) cell. Jones meets with Feinstein and her staffer Marcy Morris to inform them about the CIA Inspector General's report of the incident. Jones also deduces that the National Security Advisor Condoleezza Rice had been told to not inform the President about Office of Legal Counsel staffer John Yoo's 2002 memo containing narrower redefinitions of torture and enhanced interrogation techniques; President Bush only learned about it four years later in April 2006.

Jones finds the Panetta Review, a harshly critical internal CIA review of the EIT practices prepared in 2009 but never shared, among the files provided by the CIA. While watching TV at a bar after work, April, Julian, and Jones become discouraged as they watch a broadcast claiming that torture had yielded good intelligence and prevented terrorist attacks. Jones stays up all night to disprove the media's claims; the CIA's own records show that crucial information it claimed to have obtained by subjecting Khalid Sheikh Mohammad aka "KSM" to torture had already been obtained beforehand.

Through flashbacks, we see Mitchell and Jessen waterboard Mohammad in March 2003. Mitchell complains that when tortured, Muhammad lies to avoid more torture. Bernadette, who is witnessing from another room, admits they have a problem. Gretchen decides that the torture will continue. On April 21, 2004, President Bush denounces the use of torture on an address to the United Nations. Tenet, Bernadette, Mitchell, Jessen, Thomas Eastman, Jose Rodriguez, and John Rizzo meet to discuss how to respond. Jack Goldsmith, the OLC's new head, had repudiated and withdrawn the Torture Memos. Mitchell gives an impassioned speech in defense of his methods and Rodriguez has the program re-certified.

Jones finishes the 6,200-page report and the report is approved by the Senate Intelligence Committee, chaired by Senator Feinstein, on December 13, 2012, and sent to the CIA for final comments. However, two months later, John Brennan is sworn in as the new Director of the CIA. Brennan tells Jones and Senator Feinstein that he disagrees with many parts of the report and will not allow it to be published. Jones and Senator Feinstein sit down for a series of meetings with CIA representatives, who raise several objections to key findings in the report, such as the fact that the psychologists, Mitchell and Jessen, were unqualified to be offering advice on interrogation techniques, but were nevertheless paid $81 million of taxpayer money for their efforts.

Frustrated, Jones reveals some of the contents of the Panetta Review to Senator Mark Udall of the Intelligence Committee. Senator Udall confronts Caroline Krass during a December 17, 2013 Senate Intelligence Committee hearing on Krass' nomination to the position of CIA General Counsel, stating that he "was more confident than ever of the accuracy of the committee's 6,300 page study," and was confident in its consistency with the CIA's internal reviews, thereby revealing the existence of the Panetta Review, and highlighting the fact that the CIA's protestations (against the Senate's report) directly contradict the conclusions of the CIA's own internal Panetta Review, which agrees with the report. Meanwhile, Jones, who is fearful that the CIA will attempt to destroy all copies of the Panetta Review like they destroyed the interrogation videotapes, secretly moves a copy of a portion of the review into a safe in the Senate Hart Building.
 
The CIA, humiliated by Udall's revelation, conducts a search of Jones' workspace in violation of the agreement between the Senate and the CIA and threatens to prosecute Jones for "stealing" the Panetta Review from the CIA's computers. Jones' lawyer, Cyrus Clifford, advises him that he does not have a legal problem, but a "sunlight" or transparency problem. Jones meets with a  New York Times reporter (Matthew Rhys) and suggests he look into the CIA break-in and theft at the Senate Intelligence Committee's closed facilities. Jones is careful to provide the reporter with no details. When the Times article is published, Jones is called into a meeting with Morris and Senator Feinstein, who is visibly angry with him, but who ultimately makes a speech supporting him and formally accusing the CIA of unlawfully searching the Senate's computers in violation of the separation of powers. Brennan and the CIA are forced to back down.

Senator Feinstein tells Jones that she is prepared to publish a shorter summary of the report, but President Obama grants the CIA broad authority to redact Jones' report. Jones points out, to no avail, that the CIA's proposed heavy redactions make many of the revelations detailed in the report impossible to read or follow. Faced with unrelenting blocks to the report's publication, Jones meets in an underground parking lot with the New York Times national security reporter, but ultimately decides not to leak the report to the media.

The Republicans, most of whom oppose the release of the report, win control of the Senate in the November 2014 midterm elections, meaning the report will likely be buried forever come January 2015, when the new Congress is sworn in. Faced with this deadline, the Senate finally agrees to release the redacted report. Senator Feinstein gives a speech summarizing the report and its implications, which is followed by real-life footage of an impassioned speech in support of the report delivered by Senator John McCain, who was tortured by his captors as a prisoner of war during the Vietnam War.

The film concludes with an epilogue, delivered through a series of intertitles, explaining that Jones left his job as a Senate staffer following the release of the report. It is also noted that no CIA officers were ever criminally charged in connection with the actions outlined in the report, that many were in fact promoted, and that one (an allusion to Gina Haspel) later became director of the Agency.

Cast

Adam Driver as Daniel Jones
Annette Bening as Dianne Feinstein
Jon Hamm as Denis McDonough
Jennifer Morrison as Caroline Krass
Tim Blake Nelson as Raymond Nathan
Ted Levine as John Brennan
Michael C. Hall as Thomas Eastman
Maura Tierney as Bernadette
Sarah Goldberg as April
Lucas Dixon as Julian
Douglas Hodge as James Elmer Mitchell
T. Ryder Smith as Bruce Jessen
Fajer Al-Kaisi as Ali Soufan
Linda Powell as Marcy Morris
Dominic Fumusa as George Tenet
Noah Bean as Martin Heinrich
Corey Stoll as Cyrus Clifford
John Rothman as Sheldon Whitehouse
Joanne Tucker as Gretchen
Ian Blackman as Cofer Black
Zuhdi Boueri as Abu Zubaydah
Carlos Gomez as Jose Rodriguez
Ratnesh Dubey as Khalid Sheikh Mohammed
Scott Shepherd as Mark Udall
Kate Beahan as Candace Ames
James Hindman as Inspector General Buckley
Austin Michael Young as Agent Miller
Joseph Siravo as John Rizzo
Ben McKenzie as Scrubbed CIA Officer
Jake Silbermann as Yoked up CIA Officer
Matthew Rhys as New York Times Reporter

Production
The project was announced in April 2018 with Scott Z. Burns directing and writing, and Adam Driver, Annette Bening, Jon Hamm and Jennifer Morrison signed on to star.

PBS NewsHours Jeffrey Brown asked Burns on his motivation for making the controversial 2014 report on CIA torture into a movie. Both Burns' parents are psychologists and he found it "appalling" to learn from the Senate Intelligence Committee report, that "people had figured out a way to weaponize psychology", a profession that "exists to help people". Burns said that he and the film's producer Steven Soderbergh, felt it reflected well on the United States that the government allowed the report to be published. Soderbergh said that he did not know "that there's another country, other than maybe Canada or the U.K.", that "would have even allowed this kind of investigation."

Some of the people that appear in the film are composite characters, such as Bernadette, who bears some resemblance to Gina Haspel. Haspel oversaw the CIA black site in Thailand where Abu Zubaydah was tortured and would later manage to push her bosses to destroy the tapes of the torture. She was not, according to the Agency, in charge of the site during his interrogation.

The film began production on April 16, 2018, in New York with Tim Blake Nelson, Ben McKenzie, Matthew Rhys, Ted Levine and Michael C. Hall added to the cast the following month. In June 2018, Maura Tierney joined the cast. Originally set with a 50-day shooting schedule and $18 million budget, the allotted shooting days were cut to 26 and the final budget to $8 million.

Release
The film had its world premiere at the Sundance Film Festival on January 26, 2019. Shortly after, Amazon Studios acquired distribution rights to the film. In October 2019, it appeared as a spotlight film at the Hamptons International Film Festival. It was scheduled to be theatrically released in the United States on November 15, 2019, before being released on Amazon Prime Video two weeks later on November 29. It was previously scheduled for respective September 27 and October 11 releases.

Reception

Box office
Unlike its previous titles, Amazon did not publicly disclose theatrical gross of The Report, leading IndieWire to estimate it grossed around $150,000 from 84 theaters in its opening weekend. The site wrote that "the response, so far as we can determine, are under the usual Amazon performance." Playing in just 60 theaters the following weekend, the film made an estimated $75,000.

Critical response
The website's critical consensus reads, "The Report draws on a dark chapter in American history to offer a sober, gripping account of one public servant's crusade for accountability." On Metacritic, the film has a weighted average score of 66 out of 100, based on 33 critics, indicating "generally favorable reviews". Certain critics compared the movie to previous politics-centric dramas from the 1970s in contrast to more recently released works. For instance, Variety published by a piece by Owen Gleiberman labeling The Report as "at once gripping and eye-opening" in a way that made him think of All the President's Men.

Human Rights First awarded the 2019 Sidney Lumet Award for Integrity in Entertainment to The Report. The film also won the Cinema for Peace Award for most political film of the year in 2020.

Accolades

See also

 2019 in film
 Criticism of the war on terror
 Jon Hamm filmography
 List of Amazon Studios films
 List of historical drama films set in the information age
 Steven Soderbergh filmography

Notes

References

External links
 
 "Committee Study of the Central Intelligence Agency's Detention and Interrogation Program, Foreword by Senate Select Committee on Intelligence Chairman Dianne Feinstein, Findings and Conclusions, Executive Summary" (PDF). United States Senate Select Committee on Intelligence.   Dec 9, 2014.
 
 
 
 The Vanity Fair article 

2019 films
2019 drama films
2010s political drama films
Amazon Studios films
American political drama films
Drama films based on actual events
Films about the Central Intelligence Agency
Films based on the September 11 attacks
Films directed by Scott Z. Burns
Films produced by Scott Z. Burns
Films produced by Steven Soderbergh
Films set in 2001
Films set in 2002
Films set in 2003
Films set in 2004
Films set in 2007
Films set in 2009
Films set in 2010
Films set in 2011
Films set in 2012
Films set in 2013
Films set in 2014
Films set in Washington, D.C.
Films set in the White House
Films shot in New York (state)
Films with screenplays by Scott Z. Burns
Political films based on actual events
Torture in films
Topic Studios films
2010s English-language films
2010s American films